McCain is an Irish & Scottish English-language surname of Irish origin derived from Gaelic. The surname McCain first appeared in Derry in the province of Ulster and is Anglicised form "Mac Cathain and Ó Catháin Other spelling variations include O'Kane, Keane, McClaskey, Kane, O'Cain, McCain and many more

People with the surname

American military/political family
Many McCains fought in the American Revolution; one such was Capt John Young McCain (1760–1850) Gen. of George Washington's staff
John S. McCain Sr. (1884–1945), US Navy vice admiral
John S. McCain Jr. (1911–1981), US Navy admiral, son of John S. McCain, Sr.
Roberta McCain (1912–2020), wife of John S. McCain, Jr., mother of John S. McCain III
Sandy McCain (1934–2019), sister of John S. McCain III
John McCain (John S. McCain III) (1936–2018), US Senator, presidential candidate (2000, 2008), navy pilot, Vietnam War POW, son of John S. McCain, Jr.
Carol McCain (born 1937), ex-wife of John S. McCain III
Douglas McCain, adopted son of John S. McCain III
Andrew McCain (born 1962), adopted son of John S. McCain III
Sidney McCain (born 1966), daughter of John S. McCain III
Cindy McCain (born 1954), wife of John S. McCain III
Meghan McCain (born 1984), daughter of John S. McCain III
Renee Swift McCain (born 1983), wife of John Sidney McCain IV
James McCain (born 1988), son of John S. McCain III
Bridget McCain (born 1991), adopted daughter of John S. McCain III
Joe McCain (born 1942), brother of John S. McCain III

Other people with the surname
Ben McCain (born 1955), co-host of a morning television program in Oklahoma City
Betty Ray McCain (1931-2022), American politician
Bobby McCain (born 1993), American footballer
Brandi McCain (born 1979), former American college and professional basketballer
Brice McCain (born 1986), American footballer
Butch McCain, half of the singing songwriting team, The McCain Brothers
Chris McCain (born 1991), American footballer
Donald "Ginger" McCain (1930–2011), British horse trainer
Edwin McCain (born 1970), American singer-songwriter
Elske McCain (born 1976), American film actress
Eric McCain (born 1986), former professional gridiron footballer
Frances Lee McCain (born 1944), American actress
Franklin McCain (1941–2014), American civil rights activist and member of the Greensboro Four
Fred McCain (1917–1997), Canadian politician
Gillian McCain (born 1966), Canadian poet, author, and photography collector
Harrison McCain (1927–2004), Canadian businessmen co-founder of McCain Foods
Henry Pinckney McCain (1861–1941), officer in the United States Army
Hugh H. McCain (1854–????), produce dealer and political figure in New Brunswick, Canada
Ida McCain (1884–????), American architect
Jasper McCain ( born 1928 - Died 2013)  Sgt. Air Force 1947, National Commander Amvets (Post 8), Board of Directors Michigan Veteran Homes D.J. Jacobetti
Jerry McCain (1930–2012), blues performer
Justin McCain (born 1979), American musician, songwriter, producer and label executive
Kelly McCain (born 1983), former professional tennis player
Mac McCain (born 1998), American football player
Margaret McCain (born 1934), Canadian philanthropist and lieutenant governor of New Brunswick (1994–1997)
Michael McCain (born 1958), president and CEO of Maple Leaf Foods
Patrick McCain (born 1992), indoor footballer
Robert Stacy McCain (born 1959), American author and journalist
Rufus McCain (1903–1940), Alcatraz prisoner
Scott McCain (born 1958), former professional tennis player
Stephen McCain, retired American gymnast
Vernon McCain (1908–1993), football coach
W. T. McCain (1913–1993), American legislator and judge
Wallace McCain (1930–2011), Canadian businessmen and co-founder of McCain Foods
William David McCain (1907–1993), American archivist and college president
Yvonne McCain (1948–2011), lead plaintiff in landmark lawsuit

Characters
 Chase McCain, the main protagonist of the video game Lego City Undercover
 Desmond McCain, the main antagonist in the eight Alex Rider book, Crocodile Tears
Eden McCain, a character from the TV show Heroes
Lucas McCain, a character from the TV show The Rifleman
Mark McCain, the son of Lucas McCain

See also
McCain (disambiguation)
McKean (disambiguation)

References

Surnames
Surnames of Irish origin
Surnames of English origin
Surnames of British Isles origin
English-language surnames